Richard Stilwell III (born 6 May 1942 in St. Louis, Missouri) is an operatic and concert baritone.

After graduating from Indiana University in 1966, Stilwell joined the Army Chorus in Washington. He appeared as a soloist with the chorus singing the tribute: "One Small Step" in a national telecast with the returning astronauts of Apollo 11 and President Richard Nixon.  He also appeared with the American Light Opera Company.

He currently lives in McLean, Virginia with his wife and two sons.

Stilwell sang Billy Budd in the premiere of Britten's Billy Budd at the Metropolitan Opera, directed by John Dexter, and The Lodger in the premier of Dominick Argento's The Aspern Papers alongside Frederica Von Stade and Elisabeth Soderstrom.  He appears alongside Frederica von Stade in the landmark recording of Pelléas et Mélisande under the baton of Herbert von Karajan, and as the voice of Count Almaviva (from Le nozze di Figaro) and Don Giovanni in the 1984 film, Amadeus.

On DVD, Stilwell can be seen in Götz Friedrich's film of Falstaff (with Karan Armstrong and Gabriel Bacquier, conducted by Sir Georg Solti, 1979), La bohème from the Met (with Teresa Stratas, Renata Scotto, and José Carreras, in Franco Zeffirelli's production, 1982), and Robert Wilson's production of Madama Butterfly (2003).

Although continuing to appear at major opera houses throughout the United States and Europe, Stilwell instructs voice at the Chicago College of Performing Arts in Chicago, Illinois.

See also
 Debussy: Pelléas et Mélisande (Herbert von Karajan recording)
 Monteverdi: Il ritorno d'Ulisse in patria (Raymond Leppard recording)

Sources
Myers, Eric, Reunion: Richard Stilwell,Opera News, June 2006, vol 70, no. 12
Biography on Columbia Artists Management

External links
Interview with Richard Stilwell by Bruce Duffie, October 10, 1980

1942 births
Living people
American operatic baritones
Indiana University alumni
Roosevelt University faculty
20th-century American male opera singers
21st-century American male opera singers
Musicians from St. Louis
Classical musicians from Missouri